Markham Village (2006 population 6,090) is the historic town centre of Markham, Ontario, Canada. Originally settled in 1825, the village -- originally named "Reesorville" (reference to the Reesors settlers) sometime after 1804 and also known as "Mannheim" (likely after Mannheim) -- was a founded by Mennonites from Upstate New York and Pennsylvania. Eventually, as Upper Canada (now Ontario) started to experience immigration from the British Isles, Markham would experience significant growth. By 1825, the name "Markham" was established as the permanent name. In 1850, it was established as a police village, and in 1873 was fully incorporated as a village within York County. Markham was amalgamated with the surrounding Markham Township, which included the villages of Unionville and Thornhill in 1971, and incorporated as a town.

Population
As of 2011, Census tract profile for 0400.07 (CT) currently has a population of 3397 compared to 3418 in 2006 (Census/NHS 2011, Census 2006). This decrease in population may have been due to issues affecting this area including the high costs of property or simply birth and death rates within the area. In addition, Markham's current economic expansions in both the public services (housing, construction, public services, etc.) and finances, it is forecast that Markham will see a population drop from those deciding to move away as a result of high priced real estate.  It is currently estimated that a single family, detached home costs approximately one million Canadian dollars in Markham.

Markham Village Community Centre

Markham Village Community Centre is located on the southeast corner of Main Street Markham and Highway 7 (Side Road Allowance). It was the former site of the Markham Fair and (William Armstrong's and later Robert Goodfellow Armstrong's) Wellington Hotel. The community centre features a library (c. 1981 and renovated 2009), community rooms (above rink) and indoor ice rink (c. 1963 with rink seating for 450 originally for hockey and now home to skating club). and drop off recycling centre. The community centre is configured on a north-south axis, where as the old Agricultural Hall was east-west with much of it now occupied by the current day parking lot.

Veterans Square and Cenotaph
In the southwest corner of Markham Road and Highway 7 is the Markham Cenotaph. The area is used for annual Remembrance Day ceremonies.

Built in 1981 by Phillip Carter, the current memorial was re-vamped (2017-2018) with a new Veterans Square and Cenotaph which features an obelisk-like cenotaph and dedicated to the men and women who fought for Canada's freedom.  An earlier memorial by Rebecca Sisler (c. 1967) was moved indoors into the community centre in 1996.

Main Street Markham Farmers’ Market

From early May to early October a farmers market is set up along Robinson Street just west of Main Street. The market features local products and live entertainment and runs every Saturday from 8am to 1pm from May to October.

Education

Markham Village is home to one of York Region's oldest schools. Opened as SS #17 in 1846 (later as SS #15), it became Markham Village Public School in 1886 and currently as Franklin Street Public School since early 1960s.

Transportation

Public transit options are mostly limited by major arterial roads serving Markham Village:

 Highway 7 - York Region Transit Route 1 Highway 7 (East) and Viva Purple
 16th Avenue - YRT Route 16 16th Avenue, 41 Markham Local, 301 Brother Andre C.H.S.
 Main Street - Toronto Transit Commission Route 102D Markham Rd. with limited stops along the route

There are two routes serving both Markham and Mount Joy GO Stations:
 YRT Route 201 Markham GO Shuttle - runs partially on 16th Avenue and Main Street with rest of route on side streets
 YRT Route 301 Markham Express - runs partially on 16th Avenue and Main Street with rest of route on side streets

Three routes provides transit to students during school year with limited runs weekdays in the morning and afternoon:

 YRT Route 406 - routing on side streets in Markham Village 
 YRT Route 410 - routing partially on 16th Avenue and rest on side streets within and beyond Markham Village 
 YRT Route 411 Markham District H.S. - route on side streets to the east of Main Street and bypassing 16th Avenue and Highway 7

Markham GO Station is the only stop on the Stouffville line within Markham Village. GO bus routes 54, 70A, 70C, 71C, 71E also has limited service to the station.

Markham Santa Claus Parade

Markham Santa Claus Parade has been held in Markham Village in the month of November since 1972. The parade route begins just east of Main Street on Highway 7 and runs north along Main Street to 16th Avenue. The parade is hosted by Rotary Club of Markham and Markham-Unionville Rotary Club. The parade has been cancelled for 2020 and 2021.

Markvillle

The area between just east of Kennedy Road to just west of Robinson Creek/Main Street Markham is referred to as Markville or Raymerville – Markville East. It is not formally recognized by the City nor in most maps and included as informally within  Markham Village.

References

Neighbourhoods in Markham, Ontario
German Canadian
Markham Village, Ontario#Main Street Markham Farmers’ Market
Markham Village Community Centre Cenotaph